Lismore High Campus, part of The Rivers Secondary College, is a government-funded co-educational comprehensive secondary day school campus, located on Dalley Street, East Lismore, in the Northern Rivers region of New South Wales, Australia.

Established in 1920 as Lismore High School, the campus enrolled approximately 400 students in 2018, from Year 7 to Year 12, of whom 17 percent identified as Indigenous Australians and six percent were from a language background other than English. The school is operated by the NSW Department of Education; the principal is Chris Williams.

The Rivers Secondary College comprises the Richmond River High Campus, the Kadina High Campus, and the Lismore High Campus.

History and description

First location
Previously known as Lismore High School (LHS), the school's first site was on Lake Street, North Lismore (the present Richmond River High Campus site). On 23 November 1918, the foundation stone was laid for the new high school building by the Member for Lismore, George Nesbitt. At the time of its establishment in January 1920, it was one of only five high schools outside the Sydney metropolitan area.

The Chinese-Australian journalist Vivian Chow Yung attended LHS in its beginning years. Told in 1923 by an Irish-Australian schoolteacher at LHS, "You are Australian now. Why worry so much about China? What does China mean to you?", Chow responded "Sir, you were born in Australia, but you are always telling us about Home Rule for Ireland. What does Ireland mean to you?"

Second location

The second site of LHS was on Magellan Street in the city precinct. By 1957 LHS was one of the largest secondary schools in the state, with an enrolment of 1,438 students and a staff of 67 teachers. This represented the zenith of its enrolments as the establishment of other high schools took effect: Kyogle (1955), Mullumbimby (1955), Ballina (1956) and Richmond River (1958). The writer Bob Ellis attended LHS at this time. In a speech in May 1998, Ellis acknowledged the "selfless teachers I am proud to have known" and that "Lismore High gave us not only the intellectual armaments that made it possible for us to prevail in the great world beyond Lismore, but it also gave us a sense of that possibility".

Third location
By the late 1960s, the Magellan Street site of the school was proving to be too small for its requirements and in May 1969 LHS moved to its third site, a new complex in East Lismore. LHS, once the only high school in the district, is now one of three state, two Catholic and two Independent High Schools in Lismore. Enrolments are now relaxed at around 400 students.

The Magellan Street site has been used for educational purposes since 1882. It was originally a paddock when the Lismore Public School, established in 1867, moved there that year. The children were housed in school tents until in August 1885 they moved into a new brick building with stone foundations. From 1890 the school offered primary and secondary education, becoming the Lismore Superior School. In 1902, when the northern end of the 1885 building became unsafe, a three-storey brick building, with a covered play area on the ground floor, was built and occupied by the Girls’ Department in August 1903.

Not long afterwards, most of the remaining 1885 building was demolished. The Boys’ Department of the Lismore District School was housed in a temporary wooden building until December 1911, when it moved into a two-storey brick extension at the Keen and Magellan Streets corner. During the 1920s and 1930s allotments were acquired progressively until the whole area bounded by Keen, Magellan and Dawson Streets was available for school purposes, now home to Lismore Public School and Lismore High School. In February 1931 a third building opened. In 1942 Lismore Public School moved to a new complex and the vacated buildings were taken over by LHS.

With the shift of LHS to the East Lismore site, the new Lismore Teachers’ College opened in the Magellan Street site, which became from 1971 the Northern Rivers College of Advanced Education, which also housed the Northern Rivers Conservatorium Arts Centre. The college moved later to the north of the new East Lismore site to become the Lismore Campus of Southern Cross University.

The 1902 school buildings on Keen Street continue to house the Northern Rivers Conservatorium Arts Centre today while various other buildings were demolished. The 1931 building on Magellan Street was retained and in 2003 became home to the Lismore City Library and various other community services.

Notable alumni 

 Peter Arnison Major General, Land Commander Australia 1994–1996, Governor of Queensland 1997–2003
 Ken Buttrumformer head of the Department of Juvenile Justice of New South Wales
 Vivian Chow Yungjournalist. Founder of the "United China Magazine" in Shanghai and Foreign Affairs Editor of the "Sin Wian Pao" newspaper in Shanghai in the 1930s
 Bruce Duncanfirst ex-student to become Member for Lismore (1965–1988) in the New South Wales Legislative Assembly
 Bob Elliswriter, journalist and political commentator
 David Ellyardscience broadcaster and weatherman
 Paul Hockingsauthor, editor, filmmaker, and Professor of Anthropology at the University of Illinois
 Roy Masters football coach
 Pat Mortonformer politician; leader of the NSW Opposition (1955–1959) and Askin Cabinet Minister
 John Niland former Vice Chancellor of the University of New South Wales 1992–2002
 Richard Nott former President Australia-Britain Society, Australian Rep Friends of St. George's, CEO CGULMI 2001–2012, MD Australia MGICA 2012–16  At LHS 1954–56
 Frank Oakesfirst ex-student to become Mayor of Lismore Oakes Oval in Lismore is named after him.
 Bill Rixonpolitician; Member of NSW Parliament for Lismore (1988–1999)
 George Sharpejudge of the Supreme Court of New South Wales 1989–1993
 Isaac SmithDeputy Mayor of Lismore City Council and Councillor since September 2008
 Richard Stratfordheadmaster Sydney Boys' High School 1992–1999
 Douglas G. StuartRegents' Professor Emeritus of Physiology, The University of Arizona
 Harry Wharton zoologist and entomologist, particularly for the CSIRO

See also 

 List of government schools in New South Wales
 Education in Australia

Notes

References

External links

 
 New South Wales Department of Education and Training - Lismore High School
 NSW Schools website

Public high schools in New South Wales
1920 establishments in Australia
Educational institutions established in 1920
Lismore, New South Wales